The Verner Scarlett 7H is a Czech aircraft radial engine, designed and produced by Verner Motor of Šumperk for use in ultralight and homebuilt aircraft.

By April 2018 the engine was no longer advertised on the company website and seems to be out of production.

Design and development
The engine is a four-stroke, seven-cylinder radial,  displacement, air-cooled, direct-drive, gasoline engine design. It employs electronic ignition and produces  at 2300 rpm, with a compression ratio of 7.3:1.

Specifications (Scarlett 7H)

See also

References

External links
Official website archives on Archive.org 

Verner aircraft engines
2010s aircraft piston engines
Aircraft air-cooled radial piston engines